52nd Street is a 1937 American drama film directed by Harold Young and starring Ian Hunter. Leo Carrillo and Pat Paterson. An independent production by Walter Wanger it was distributed by United Artists. It portrays the rise of 52nd Street in Manhattan as a major hub of nightclubs in the 1930s.

Cast

 Ian Hunter as 	Rufus Rondell
 Leo Carrillo as 	Fiorello Zamarelli
 Pat Paterson as Margaret Rondell
 Ella Logan as Betty
 Zasu Pitts as Letitia Rondell
 Marla Shelton as Evelyn Macy Rondell
 Collette Lyons as Minnie
 Dorothy Peterson as 	Adela Rondell
 Kenny Baker as 'Benny' Zamarelli
 Al Shean as Klauber
 Sid Silvers as Sid
 Jack White as Jack
 Jack Adair as	Porky
 George Tapps as George Tapps
 Jerry Colonna as Specialty Vocalist
 Roman Bohnen as James
 Wade Boteler as Butler
 Pat Harrington Sr. as Pat Harrington
 Al Norman as Al Norman
 Maurice Rocco as Maurice Rocco
 Dotty Saulter as Dorothy
 Delmar Watson as 	Young Benjamin 
 Frank Mills as Party Guest 
 Edmund Mortimer as 	Nightclub Patron
 Cyril Ring as Nightclub Patron
 Mary MacLaren as Nightclub Patron 
 Jim Thorpe as Street Thug 
 Frank O'Connor as 	Policeman

Reception
The film recorded a loss of $4,392.

References

Bibliography
 Stumpf, Charles. ZaSu Pitts: The Life and Career. McFarland, 2010.

External links
 
 

1937 films
Films directed by Harold Young (director)
1937 drama films
American drama films
Films produced by Walter Wanger
American black-and-white films
1930s English-language films
United Artists films
Films set in New York City
1930s American films
Films set in nightclubs